The Malaysia Athletics Federation is the governing body for the sport of athletics in Malaysia, is a member of the World Athletics. The MAF main headquarters is located at Wisma OCM, Jalan Hang Jebat. Formerly known as Malaysia Amateur Athletic Union (MAAU).

Championships
Malaysia Athletics Federation organises championships every year in each of the sporting disciplines.

Presidents

Before 2006 : ???
2006–2012 : Shahidan Kassim
2012–2014 : Zainal Abidin Ahmad
2014–2019 : Karim Ibrahim
2019–2022 : SM Muthu
2022–Present : Shahidan Kassim

See also
 List of Malaysian records in athletics

References

External links
Official website
 Malaysia Athletics Federation - Tag Archive - Sports247.My

National members of the Asian Athletics Association
Athletics
Sports organizations established in 1913
1913 establishments in British Malaya